Ahmed Vefik Pasha (3 July 1823 2 April 1891) was an Ottoman statesman, diplomat, scholar, playwright, and translator during the Tanzimat and First Constitutional Era periods. He was commissioned with top-rank governmental duties, including presiding over the first Ottoman Parliament in 1877. He also served as Grand Vizier for two brief periods. He also established the first Ottoman theatre and initiated the first Western style theatre plays in Bursa and translated Molière's major works. His portrait was depicted on the Turkish postcard stamp dated 1966.

Biography
Ahmed Vefik Pasha was born of Greek extraction, his ancestors having previously converted to Islam, like many other Greek Muslims particularly from Crete (Cretan Turks) and Southern Macedonia in what is now northwestern Republic of Greece (see Vallahades). He started his education in 1831 in Constantinople and later went to Paris with his family, where he graduated from Saint Louis College.

Ahmed Vefik became the Minister of Education of the Ottoman Empire and Grand Vizier two times. He built a theatre in Bursa when he was made the governor of the city. In 1860, he became the Ottoman ambassador to France. He wrote the first Turkish dictionary and is considered to be the among the first Pan-Turkists.

References

Further reading

  This contains a more detailed biography, although comparison with the newer Encyclopædia Britannica entry suggests the information about his early life is in error.

1823 births
1891 deaths
People from the Ottoman Empire of Greek descent
19th-century writers from the Ottoman Empire
Ambassadors of the Ottoman Empire to Iran
19th-century Grand Viziers of the Ottoman Empire
Turks from the Ottoman Empire
Greek Muslims
Ottoman people of the Russo-Turkish War (1877–1878)
Vefik, Ahmed Pasha
Lycée Saint-Louis alumni
Turkish novelists
French–Turkish translators